Jerseyempheria is an extinct genus of empheriid psocodean which existed in what is now New Jersey during the Cretaceous period. It was named by Dany Azar, André Nel and Julian F. Petrulevicius in 2010, and the type species is Jerseyempheria grimaldii.

References

Psocoptera genera
Prehistoric insect genera
Cretaceous insects
Fossil taxa described in 2010
Prehistoric insects of North America